Dil Daulat Duniya  is a 1972 Hindi-language comedy-drama film, directed by Prem Narayan Arora and starring Rajesh Khanna, Sadhana, Ashok Kumar, Om Prakash, Sulochana, Helen and Jagdeep. The film revolves around a poor man in a palatial house who allows other newcomers in city of Mumbai to stay in his house as he feels pity on them. The music was scored by Shankar Jaikishan and songs are sung by Kishore Kumar for Rajesh Khanna. This movie was accepted by Khanna, only because he wanted to pay tribute to the acting talents of his seniors Ashok Kumar and Om Prakash, as his name would ensure that distributors would sell the film and it would reach a larger audience. The newspaper "The Hindu", in its review said "Ashok Kumar and Om Prakash are the soul of the movie and dominate the show with their acting dexterity." The film fetched 1.5 crores at the box office. As of 2012, this was among the top 10 searched movies of Khanna online.

The film is remake of 1948 Hindi film Pugree, starring Kamani Kaushal, which was produced by Prem Narayan Arora and the same producer decided to direct the remake in 1972. Prem Narayan Arora, is the first husband of actress Helen and he directed this film for Helen to reprise the role performed by Sasikala in the original movie. The plot of the 1948 film Pugree was borrowed from the classic 1947 Hollywood hit It Happened on Fifth Avenue.

Cast
Ashok Kumar as Sheth Kalidas / Kalluram 'Kalwa'
Sadhana as Roopa 
Rajesh Khanna as Vijay
Helen as Rita
Om Prakash as Udharchand Shikarpuri
Sulochana Latkar as Mrs. Rani Kalidas / Mishrain / Bawarchan 
Jagdeep as Kanhaiya 'Kunnu'
Agha as Raju
Bela Bose as Kiran
Ram Avtar as Hari
Keshav Rana as Veterinarian
Tun Tun as Baby's Mother
Indira Bansal as Baby
Polson as Havaldar

Soundtrack

See also
 It Happened on Fifth Avenue

References

External links
 

1972 films
1970s Hindi-language films
Indian romantic comedy-drama films
1970s romantic comedy-drama films
Films scored by Shankar–Jaikishan
Remakes of Indian films
1972 comedy-drama films